Len Fulton (c. 1934 - 2011) was an author, publisher, and local politician in California.

He owned Dustbooks, a publishing business that produced the Small Press Review annually. He had an important role in promoting small publishers and authors producing work outside major publishing channels.

He was interviewed in 2003.

Work
The Grassman
Dark Other Adam Dreaming
International Directory of Little Magazines and Small Presses (1974)
American odyssey, a bookselling travelogue Jan. 1, 1975

References

Writers from California
California local politicians
Publishers from California
1930s births
2011 deaths
Year of birth uncertain